Compact as used in politics may refer broadly to a pact or treaty; in more specific cases it may refer to:
 Interstate compact
 Blood compact, an ancient ritual of the Philippines
 Compact government, a type of colonial rule utilized in British North America
 Compact of Free Association whereby the sovereign states of the Federated States of Micronesia, the Republic of the Marshall Islands and the Republic of Palau have entered into as associated states with the United States.
 Mayflower Compact, the first governing document of Plymouth Colony
 United Nations Global Compact
 Global Compact for Migration, a UN non-binding intergovernmental agreement

Mathematics 
 Compact element, those elements of a partially ordered set that cannot be subsumed by a supremum of any directed set that does not already contain them
 Compact operator, a linear operator that takes bounded subsets to relatively compact subsets, in functional analysis
 Compact space, a topological space such that every open cover has a finite subcover
 Quasi-compact morphism, a morphism of schemes for which the inverse image of any quasi-compact open set is again quasi-compact

Publications 
 Compact (American magazine), a U.S.-based online magazine
 Compact (German magazine), a far-right German magazine
 Compact (newspaper), a broadsheet-quality newspaper printed in a tabloid format

Other uses 
 Compact car, a classification of automobile size
 Compact sport utility vehicle
 Compact (cosmetics), a case containing one or more of the following, a mirror, pressed powder, and/or a powder puff
 Compact disc
 Compact Software, a technology company founded in 1973
 Compact (TV series), a 1960s British soap opera
 Compact star, also called a compact object, a degenerate star like a neutron star

See also 
 Campact, a German nongovernmental organization
 Kompakt, a German record label